The year 1995 is the 3rd year in the history of the Ultimate Fighting Championship (UFC), a mixed martial arts promotion based in the United States. In 1995 the UFC held 4 events beginning with, UFC 5.

Title fights

Debut UFC fighters

The following fighters fought their first UFC fight in 1995:

Andy Anderson
Asbel Cancio
Dave Beneteau
David Hood
Ernie Verdicia
Francesco Maturi
Gerry Harris
Geza Kalman

He-Man Ali Gipson
Jack McLaughlin
Joel Sutton
John Dowdy
John Matua
Jon Hess
Larry Cureton
Marco Ruas
Mark Hall

Oleg Taktarov
Onassis Parungao
Paul Varelans
Rudyard Moncayo
Ryan Parker
Scott Bessac
Tank Abbott
Todd Medina

Events list

See also
 UFC
 List of UFC champions
 List of UFC events

References

Ultimate Fighting Championship by year
1995 in mixed martial arts